Bretton Bridge is a bridge in Flintshire, Wales. Situated between the villages of Broughton and Bretton, Bretton Bridge used to be a back-road link, often used to avoid the congestion on the A5104 (Saltney Straight).

The bridge still exists today, although its use has changed from a road to a public footpath, linking the lower part of Broughton village with Broughton Park.

The bridge itself used to act as a railway bridge when the line between Broughton and Kinnerton existed.  The path of the old line can clearly be seen through the country park in Broughton, where a swerve now exists following the old line of the railway.  Residents in neighbouring properties (The Boulevard) found remains of railway sleepers in back gardens in the late 1980s.

Bridges in Flintshire
Pedestrian bridges in Wales